Jane Hogg  may refer to:

Jane Williams (1798–1884), muse of Shelley, married name Jane Hogg
Jane Hogg, character in Adventures of a Private Eye